The Greek Cricket Championship is the most important domestic competition of cricket in Greece. It is organised by Hellenic Cricket Federation. Every year they are organised two competitions. One indoor championship is organised during winter period and one outdoor championship, during summer period. The clubs of Corfu star in the championship as well as the sport has popularity mostly in Corfu.

Outdoor championships

Indoor championships

References

External links
Hellenic Cricket Federation

Cricket in Greece
Cricket
Cricket